Lake Webb is a manmade recreational lake in Kern County, California. It is primarily a motorboat, jet skiing, and waterskiing lake. It is one of two lakes that are part of the Buena Vista Aquatic Recreation Area southwest of Bakersfield. The lake is located on the lakebed of the former Buena Vista Lake.

See also
Lake Evans
List of lakes in California

References

External links
Buena Vista Aquatic Recreational Area

Webb, Lake
Webb, Lake
Webb
Webb